Fagus ferruginea may refer to one of the beech species:

 Fagus ferruginea Dryand., a synonym for Fagus grandifolia subsp. grandifolia (American beech)
 Fagus ferruginea var. caroliniana Loudon, also a synonym for Fagus grandifolia subsp. grandifolia
 Fagus ferruginea Siebold (Invalid), a synonym for Fagus crenata Blume (Japanese beech)

References 
Fagus ferruginea The Plant List.